FJB may refer to:

 F. J. Brennan Catholic High School, in Windsor, Ontario, Canada
 Fender Jazz Bass, an electric bass guitar
 Wien Franz-Josefs-Bahnhof, a train station in Vienna, Austria
 Fuck Joe Biden, a political slogan used by people in the United States